The  are a mountain range in central Honshū, Japan, bordering Nagano, Yamanashi and Shizuoka prefectures.

Origin of the name 
There are a lot of red stones (赤石 Aka-Ishi) around the Akaishi River, a tributary of the Ōi River in the southern part of Southern Alps. Then it was said that the mountain of red stone came to be called Mount Akaishi.  The mountain represents the mountain range and the name Akaishi is used for the whole range mountain range, Akaishi Mountains.

Major peaks 
Almost all major peaks of the Akaishi Mountains are in Minami Alps National Park that was established on June 1, 1964. 
The range is the source of two rivers, Ōi River and Tenryū River, which flow to the Pacific Ocean.

Panorama

Flora and fauna 
Alpine plants, such as Siberian dwarf pine can be seen above the tree line. Rock ptarmigan and spotted nutcracker also live in the alpine zone. Japanese serow and sika deer live in the forest belt on the mountain slopes.  is endemic to Mount Kita.

Walter Weston in the Japanese Alps 
 
Englishman Walter Weston introduced the Western world to the Japanese Alps in his book Mountaineering and Exploring in the Japanese Alps. During his visits to Japan, he climbed Akaishi Mountains. Several monuments in his memory have been set up in several places in the Japanese Alps.

He climbed the following peaks: 
 1892 Mount Akaishi - The first non-Japanese to climb this mountain
 1902 Mount Kita
 1903 Mount Kaikoma
 1904 Mount Hōō and Mount Senjō

See also 
Japanese Alps
Hida Mountains (Northern Alps)
Kiso Mountains (Central Alps)
Minami Alps National Park
Minami-Alps Biosphere Reserve
100 Famous Japanese Mountains
Walter Weston

References

Books 
Mountaineering and Exploring in the Japanese Alps -by Walter Weston (1896)

External links 

Yamanashi Nichinichi Newspaper: Minami Alps website

 
Japan Alps
Mountain ranges of Nagano Prefecture
Mountain ranges of Shizuoka Prefecture
Mountain ranges of Yamanashi Prefecture